Cyril Edward Gourley VC MM (19 January 1893 – 31 January 1982) was an English recipient of the Victoria Cross, the highest and most prestigious award for gallantry in the face of the enemy that can be awarded to British and Commonwealth forces.

Early life
Cyril Edward Gourley was born in Wavertree, Liverpool and educated at Calday Grange Grammar School and Liverpool University, graduating in 1913.

First World War service
Gourley had joined 7th Lancashire Battery of the IV West Lancashire (Howitzer) Brigade, Royal Field Artillery (Territorial Force) in May 1914. He was mobilised with his unit on the outbreak of war in August 1914 and went with it to the Western Front. His battery was transferred to CCLXXVI (276) Brigade in 1916. In September 1917, he was awarded the Military Medal for conspicuous gallantry in putting out a fire near an ammunition dump.

Victoria Cross
Gourley was 24 years old, and a sergeant in D (Howitzer) Battery of 276th (West Lancashire) Brigade, RFA, when the following deed took place for which he was awarded the VC.

On 30 November 1917 at Little Priel Farm, east of Epehy, France, during the Battle of Cambrai, Sergeant Gourley was in command of a section of howitzers of the 55th (West Lancashire) Division. During an enemy advance, when their forces were within a few hundred yards of him, both to the front and on one flank, and though plagued by snipers, Sergeant Gourley managed to keep one gun firing. At one point he pulled the gun out of the pit and engaged a machine-gun at 500 yards, knocking it out with a direct hit. All day he held the Germans in check, firing over open sights on enemy parties, thereby saving his guns, which were withdrawn at nightfall.

The citation reads:

Gourley was originally denied a commission due to "defective eyesight", but later rose to the rank of captain.

Post-war
From 1919, Gourley worked for Lever Brothers, travelling widely to open up new business for the company. On his retirement a director of the company spoke of "...his quiet, gentle courteousness and his readiness to do all he could for other people. In fact he was a jolly good man to have beside you when you were in trouble". In 1925, the Gourley family moved to Hill Close, School Lane, off Column Road, Grange, West Kirby; the house was later renamed Gourley Grange and the lane renamed Gourley's Lane in his honour. The gardens created by the Gourley family have now been redeveloped as a small housing estate.

During the Second World War, Gourley was a firewatcher in Liverpool.

In 1952, he moved to Haslemere, Surrey, where he died on 31 January 1982. He is buried in Grange Cemetery, West Kirby, Wirral. Gourley never married.

The Trustees of The Cyril Edward Gourley Victoria Cross Endowment, Registered Charity 525987, set up in his honour after the First World War from local donations, provide grants to University Students who attended schools, or reside in the Hoylake and West Kirby area, subject to certain conditions.

The medal
His Victoria Cross, along with his other medals which include the Croix de Guerre, is held by the Royal Artillery Museum.

Footnotes

References

Further reading
 
 
 
 Anon, History of the 359 (4th West Lancs.) Medium Regiment R.A. (T.A.) 1859–1959, Liverpool: 359 Medium Regiment, 1959.
 Rev J. O. Coop, The Story of the 55th (West Lancashire) Division, Liverpool: Daily Post Printers, 1919/Uckfield: Naval & Military Press, 2002, .
 Gen Sir Martin Farndale, History of the Royal Regiment of Artillery: Western Front 1914–18, Woolwich: Royal Artillery Institution, 1986, .
 Norman E. H. Litchfield, The Territorial Artillery 1908–1988 (Their Lineage, Uniforms and Badges), Nottingham: Sherwood Press, 1992, .

External links
Location of grave and VC medal (Cheshire)

1893 births
1982 deaths
Royal Field Artillery soldiers
Royal Field Artillery officers
British Army personnel of World War I
British Army recipients of the Victoria Cross
British World War I recipients of the Victoria Cross
Recipients of the Croix de Guerre 1914–1918 (France)
Recipients of the Military Medal
Victoria Cross awardees from Liverpool
Alumni of the University of Liverpool
People educated at Calday Grange Grammar School
Burials in Merseyside